Tom Levorstad (born 5 July 1957) is a Norwegian former ski jumper who competed from 1980 to 1982. He won a bronze medal at the FIS Ski-Flying World Championships 1981 in Oberstdorf.

Levorstad's best World Cup finish was third in an individual large hill event in France in 1980.

References

1957 births
Living people
Norwegian male ski jumpers
Place of birth missing (living people)